RAF Deanland is a former Royal Air Force advanced landing ground located  west of Hailsham, East Sussex and  north east of Brighton, East Sussex, England

History
RAF Deanland was planned as an Advanced Landing Ground in order to provide support for the D-Day Landings on 6 June 1944, with construction started in Spring 1943.
The first aircraft to take to the air on D-Day flew from RAF Deanland, providing top-cover over the OMAHA and GOLD landing beaches.

The airfield was heavily involved in the fight against the V-1 flying bomb's (with 185 destroyed) and during D-Day where it is believed to be home of the first Supermarine Spitfire squadron to provide air cover.

The landing ground was used by multiple units:
 No. 64 Squadron RAF
 No. 91 Squadron RAF
 No. 234 Squadron RAF
 No. 302 Polish Fighter Squadron
 No. 308 Polish Fighter Squadron
 No. 317 Polish Fighter Squadron
 No. 322 (Dutch) Squadron RAF
 No. 345 Squadron RAF
 No. 611 Squadron RAF
 No. 131 Airfield RAF
 No. 149 Airfield RAF
 No. 149 (Long Range Fighter) Wing RAF
Along with the following ground units at some point:
 No. 2750 Squadron RAF Regiment
 No. 2768 Squadron RAF Regiment

On 6 June 1994, an oak-tree was planted at the western end of the airfield entrance-road. This tree is a memorial to those pilots who flew from Deanland and died in operations.

Current use

The Airfield was dormant for a time, post-war, but the land came into the ownership of Richard Chandless, a farmer, who reactivated the site as an airfield in 1963. Richard operated his own aircraft, and he was for a number of years the main U.K. agent for Avions Pierre Robin demonstrating and selling new and used aircraft from Deanland. Richard invited a number of other aircraft owners to keep their machines at Deanland. During Chandless' time Deanland became a very active airfield, both day and night, lights were installed shortly after the runway was re-activated. It was used by a number of local business people, farmers and visitors to the area. With Glyndebourne Opera House close it was very normal to see both light aircraft and helicopters parked while their owners enjoyed the opera. In 1991 the airfield came into the ownership of Deanland Airfield LLP. In 2012 the airfield is still in use as a private airstrip.

References

Citations

Bibliography

External links
 Official web site

Royal Air Force stations in East Sussex
Royal Air Force stations of World War II in the United Kingdom